Trichodes quadriguttatus is a beetle species of checkered beetles belonging to the family Cleridae, subfamily Clerinae. It can be found in Bulgaria, Greece, Kosovo, Montenegro, Serbia, Voivodina, and Near East.

References

quadriguttatus
Beetles of Europe
Beetles described in 1917